Skyler Davenport is an American actor. They are known for their voice acting work, and their role as Sophie in the 2021 film See for Me.

Career 
In March 2017, Davenport was cast as Kunoichi in the English dub of the Samurai Warriors anime.

In 2021, Davenport starred in their first leading role in the thriller film See for Me as Sophie, a blind former skier. They described Sophie as "morally complicated", adding: "In a way, it's almost like the part of us that we don't want to admit is there. It's just out in the open for her." The film received positive reviews from critics, with praise directed at Davenport's performance. Jude Dry of IndieWire said that Davenport "anchors the action with their instinctual performance, playing Sophie with a pointed ferocity that is clearly masking deep pain."

In 2021, Davenport voiced Azusa Aizawa in I've Been Killing Slimes for 300 Years and Maxed Out My Level. In February 2022, they voiced Najimi Osana in Netflix's English dub of Komi Can't Communicate, and in May, they were cast as Shii Eniwa in the dub of the anime adaptation of Super Cub.

Personal life 
Davenport identifies as non-binary and asexual. Davenport is visually impaired, following a stroke caused by a hemiplegic migraine in 2012. They are also autistic and reside in Los Angeles.

Filmography

Film

Television

Anime

Live action

Video games

References

External links 

 
 
 
 

Living people
American non-binary actors
American film actors
American television actors
American video game actors
LGBT people from California
Blind actors
American voice actors
Year of birth missing (living people)
Asexual non-binary people
Actors with autism